Leith Theatre (also known as Leith Town Hall and alternatively, in 1975 and 1976, Citadel Theatre) is a theatre located on Ferry Road in Edinburgh, Scotland. It opened in 1932 and ceased operation in 1988. Following the efforts of Leith Theatre Trust, fundraising and campaigning is currently underway to support Leith Theatre's redevelopment and eventual full reopening as an arts and community venue.

History of the building
Leith Theatre was a gift from the people of Edinburgh to the people of Leith, following the forced merger of the burgh of Leith into the larger city in 1920. Construction started in 1929. It was designed by Bradshaw Gass & Hope and opened in 1932. It was badly damaged by bombing during the Second World War and remained closed until 1961.

The Town Hall building, which houses the Leith Theatre in its East Wing and the Thomas Morton Hall (named after the shipwright, Thomas Morton) in its West Wing, stands adjacent to the Leith Library.  The smaller Thomas Morton Hall portion of the complex is still in use, for receptions and parties.

The Leith Theatre Trust was organized in 2004 to "facilitate the refurbishment of Leith Theatre, it’s [sic] reopening and ongoing management."

Edinburgh International Festival

The theatre was first used by the Edinburgh International Festival in 1961 for a ceilidh, and from the following year it became the second music venue of the festival, after the Usher Hall.

Between 1962 and the end of the 1970s a long series of the world's greatest musicians performed in the theatre including groups like the Amadeus Quartet, Borodin Quartet, the English Chamber Orchestra, and Schola Cantorum Basiliensis, and the singers Janet Baker, Teresa Berganza, Dietrich Fischer-Dieskau,  Jessye Norman, Peter Pears, Hermann Prey, Irmgard Seefried, and Galina Vishnevskaya.

Famous instrumentalists included Larry Adler, Daniel Barenboim, Alfred Brendel, Benjamin Britten, Julian Bream, Rudolf Firkušný, Annie Fischer, Pierre Fournier, Szymon Goldberg, Leonid Kogan, Radu Lupu, Nikita Magaloff, Jacqueline du Pré, Mstislav Rostropovich, and Rosalyn Tureck.

Other performances

The stage was also used by legendary director Yuri Lyubimov.

Over the years the theatre hosted a wide variety of famous pop artists and bands, including Mott the Hoople, Thin Lizzy and AC/DC.

Re-opening

In May 2017, the Leith Theatre was used for the first time in 25 years, when the public was welcomed to the Hidden Door arts festival. The Hidden Door, which is a volunteer-run arts collective that exposes the hidden spaces of derelict buildings by using them as temporary performance venues, returned to the Leith Theatre for its May 2018 event.

References

External links
 Arts review: Hidden Door Festival, Leith Theatre & State Cinema, Edinburgh The Scotsman

Theatres in Edinburgh
Buildings and structures in Leith
Music venues in Edinburgh